

2008-09 Results

References

Central Michigan
Central Michigan Chippewas men's basketball seasons